Enrique Jorrín (Candelaria, Pinar del Río, December 25, 1926 - Havana, December 12, 1987) was a Cuban charanga violinist, composer and music director. He is considered the inventor of the cha-cha-chá, a popular style of ballroom music derived from danzón.

Biography

At an early age, his family moved to the El Cerro neighborhood of Havana, where Jorrín was to live for the rest of his life. At the age of 12, he began to show a particular interest in music and decided to learn the violin.  He then pursued musical studies at the Municipal Conservatory of Havana.

He started out as a violinist in the orchestra of Cuba's National Institute of Music, under the direction of González Mántici.  In 1941, he became a member of the danzonera Hermanos Contreras.  It was here that he became interested in popular music.  Next, he joined the renowned charanga Antonio Arcaño y sus Maravillas.

In the early 1950s, while a member of Ninón Mondéjar's Orquesta América, he created a new genre of dance music which became known as the cha-cha-chá.

He lived in Mexico from 1954 to 1958 after a tour with the América. He and Félix Reina, the other violinist in the group, decided to stay. In 1964, he toured Africa and Europe with his orchestra- Orquesta de Enrique Jorrín. From 1964 onwards, he recorded extensively for the Cuban record label EGREM.

In 1974, he organized a new charanga, which included singer Tito Gómez and pianist Rubén González. This orchestra is still active in Havana and includes many songs by Jorrín in their active repertoire.

All his accomplishments were all fulfilled while raising his nephew Omar Jorrin Pineda, who grew up playing the piano for the orchestra as he got older. Omar Jorrin Pineda currently resides in a small Cuban community in New Jersey known to be Union City.

Works 

Among his numerous compositions are:

Danzones:
 Hilda
 Liceo del Pilar
 Central constancia
 Doña Olga
 Silver Star

Cha-cha-chás:
 Arpeando el Cha-cha-chá with Miriam de Cinca on harp
 La engañadora
 El alardoso
 El túnel
 Nada para ti
 Osiris
 Me muero

Discography

 Orquesta de Enrique Jorrín; "Todo Chachacha"; Egrem CD-0044
 Orquesta Enrique Jorrín; "Por Siempre Jorrín"; Egrem CD-0644

References

 Orovio, Helio. 1981. Diccionario de la Música Cubana. La Habana, Editorial Letras Cubanas. 

Cuban violinists
Male violinists
Cuban composers
Male composers
Cuban bandleaders
Cuban charanga musicians
Mambo musicians
Cha-cha-cha musicians
1926 births
1987 deaths
20th-century violinists
20th-century composers
20th-century male musicians
Cuban male musicians